Mill Creek Marsh is a nature preserve in the New Jersey Meadowlands located in Secaucus at its border with North Bergen, the Cromakill Creek, in Hudson County, New Jersey. It is fed by the Hackensack River,
and is a contributing property to the Hackensack RiverWalk.

It is contiguous to the west by Mill Creek and the Schmidts Woods and Secaucus High School, to the north by Western Brackish Marsh, to the east by the Eastern Brackish Marsh, and Cromakill Marsh.

The Eastern Spur of New Jersey Turnpike runs through the nature area, which is bordered to the south by The Plaza at Harmon Meadow, which includes the Mall at Mill Creek.

History

Much of the land was acquired from Hartz Mountain.
The 209-acre Mill Creek Marsh was acquired for preservation by the New Jersey Meadowlands Commission in 1996. Two years later, the Commission began to remediate the site, including re-establishing the tidal flow, constructing trails and planting native vegetation.

See also
Berrys Creek

References 

Secaucus, New Jersey
Parks in Hudson County, New Jersey
Neighborhoods in Hudson County, New Jersey
1996 establishments in New Jersey
New Jersey Meadowlands District
Nature reserves in New Jersey